Joycelyn may refer to:

Joycelyn Elders (born 1933), American pediatrician, Surgeon General of the United States
Joycelyn Harrison (born 1964), African-American engineer, Associate Dean at Kent State University
Joycelyn Ko (born 1986), former Canadian badminton player
Joycelyn O'Brien, American actress in theater, film and television
Joycelyn Tetteh (born 1988), Ghanaian Member of Parliament
Joycelyn Wilson, Assistant Professor at the Georgia Institute of Technology

See also
Jessalyn
Jesselyn
Jocelyn
Jocelyne
Josceline
Joscelyne
Joslin (disambiguation)
Joslyn
Josselin
Josslyn (disambiguation)